SV Wallern is a football team based in Austria.

It currently plays in the 4th tier OÖ Liga.

Players

References

External links 
Official Website

Football clubs in Austria
Football in Austria